The San Jose Sharks are a professional ice hockey team based in San Jose, California. They compete in the National Hockey League (NHL) as a member of the Pacific Division in the Western Conference, and are owned by San Jose Sports & Entertainment Enterprises. Beginning play in the 1991–92 season, the Sharks initially played their home games at the Cow Palace, before moving to their present home, now named SAP Center at San Jose, in 1993; the SAP Center is known locally as "the Shark Tank". The Sharks are affiliated with the San Jose Barracuda of the American Hockey League (AHL) and the Wichita Thunder of the ECHL.

The Sharks were founded in 1991 as the first NHL franchise based in the San Francisco Bay Area since the California Golden Seals relocated to Cleveland in 1976. The Sharks have advanced to the Stanley Cup Finals once, losing to the Pittsburgh Penguins in 2016. They have won the Presidents' Trophy once, as the team with the league's best regular season record in the 2008–09 season. They have also won six division titles as a member of the Pacific Division since 1993.

History

Formation
Professional hockey in the Bay Area can be traced to the San Francisco Shamrocks of the Pacific Coast Hockey League from 1944 to 1950. The Sharks origins began with the San Francisco Seals of the Western Hockey League (WHL) when they were awarded an expansion franchise for San Francisco on April 23, 1961, to former Vancouver Canucks owner Coleman (Coley) Hall, on the condition that an ice surface is installed in the Cow Palace. The Seals won three WHL championships and renamed to the California Seals in 1966, playing their games at the Oakland Coliseum Arena.

The following season, the California Golden Seals joined the NHL, played their seasons from 1967 to 1976, who were neither successful on the ice nor at the box office. Gordon and George Gund III became minority owners of the Seals in 1974, and were instrumental in their move to Cleveland in 1976 and a 1978 merger with the Minnesota North Stars, which they purchased that year. They had long wanted to bring hockey back to the Bay Area, and asked the NHL for permission to move the North Stars there in the late 1980s, but the league vetoed the proposed move. Meanwhile, a group led by former Hartford Whalers owner Howard Baldwin was pushing the NHL to bring a team to San Jose, where a new arena was being built. Eventually, the League struck a compromise: the Gunds would sell their share of the North Stars to Baldwin's group, with the Gunds receiving an expansion team in the Bay Area to begin play in the 1991–92 season and being allowed to take a certain number of players from the North Stars to their new club. In return, the North Stars would be allowed to participate as an equal partner in an expansion draft with the new Bay Area team. On May 5, 1990, the Gunds officially sold their share of the North Stars to Baldwin and were awarded a new team for the Bay Area, based in San Jose. The owners paid to the league an expansion fee of US$45 million and the new franchise was approved on May 9.

Over 5,000 potential names were submitted by mail for the new team. While the first-place finisher was "Blades", the Gunds were concerned about the name's potentially negative association with weapons, and went with the runner-up, "Sharks." The name was said to have been inspired by the large number of sharks living in the Pacific Ocean. Seven varieties live there, and one area of water near the Bay Area is known as the "red triangle" (hence the triangle in the team's logo) because of its shark population.

Matt Levine—the team's first marketing head—said of the new name, "Sharks are relentless, determined, swift, agile, bright and fearless. We plan to build an organization that has all those qualities."

Cow Palace years (1991–1993)

For their first two seasons, the Sharks played at the Cow Palace in Daly City, just outside San Francisco, a facility the NHL and the Seals had rejected in 1967. Pat Falloon was their first draft choice and led the team in points during their first season. The team was placed in the Campbell Conference's Smythe Division. George Kingston was their first head coach during their first two seasons. Though the 1991–92 roster consisted primarily of NHL journeymen, minor leaguers and rookies, the Sharks had at least one notable player when they acquired 14-year veteran and former Norris Trophy-winning defenseman Doug Wilson from the Chicago Blackhawks on September 6, 1991. Wilson was named the team's first captain and All-Star representative in the inaugural season. However, the Sharks' first two seasons saw the typical struggles for an expansion team. The 71 losses in 1992–93 is an NHL record, and they also suffered a 17-game losing streak, while winning just 11 games and earning a mere 24 points in the standings. Kingston was fired following the end of the 1992–93 season.

Despite the Sharks' futility in the standings, the team led the NHL's merchandise sales with $150 million, accounting for 27% of the NHL's total and behind only National Basketball Association champions Chicago Bulls among all North American leagues. Several team "firsts" happened in the 1992–93 season. On November 17, 1992, San Jose goaltender Arturs Irbe recorded the first shutout in team history, defeating the Los Angeles Kings 6–0. On December 3, against the Hartford Whalers at the Cow Palace, right winger Rob Gaudreau scored the first hat-trick in franchise history; he also scored the team's second-ever hat-trick nine days later against the Quebec Nordiques.

The inaugural year also saw the introduction of the San Jose Sharks mascot, "S. J. Sharkie". On January 28, 1992, at a game against the New York Rangers, the then-unnamed mascot emerged from a Zamboni during an intermission. A "Name the Mascot" contest began that night, with the winning name of "S. J. Sharkie" being announced on April 15, 1992.

Early success and rebuilding (1993–1997)

For their third season, 1993–94, the Sharks moved to their new home, the San Jose Arena, and were placed in the Western Conference's Pacific Division. Under head coach Kevin Constantine, the Sharks pulled off the biggest turnaround in NHL history, finishing with a 33–35–16 record and making the Stanley Cup playoffs for the first time in team history with 82 points, an NHL record 58-point jump from the previous season. They were seeded eighth in the Western Conference playoffs and faced the Detroit Red Wings, the top-seeded Western Conference team and a favorite to win the Stanley Cup. In one of the biggest upsets in Stanley Cup playoff history, the underdog Sharks shocked the Red Wings in seven games. In Game 7 at Joe Louis Arena, Jamie Baker scored the game-winning goal in the third period after goaltender Chris Osgood was out of position and the Sharks won 3–2. In the second round, the Sharks had a 3–2 series lead over the Toronto Maple Leafs, but lost the final two games in Toronto, including an overtime loss in Game 6.

In 1994–95, the Sharks earned their second-straight playoff berth and again reached the second round. Ray Whitney scored a goal in double overtime of Game 7 of the Conference Quarter-finals against the Calgary Flames. Key Sharks players included goaltender Arturs Irbe, defenseman Sandis Ozolinsh and forwards Igor Larionov and Sergei Makarov. Despite their success against Calgary, round two would prove to be a disaster for the Sharks, when they lost in a four-game sweep to Detroit (in a rematch of the previous year) without even holding a single lead in all four games. However, the 1995 season also saw the only rainout in the history of the NHL, when the Guadalupe River flooded its banks in March 1995, making it impossible for anyone to get into the San Jose Arena for a game between the Sharks and the Detroit Red Wings.

In 1995–96, the Sharks finished last in the Pacific Division and failed to make the playoffs. The team also underwent major changes: during the season, they traded Ozolinsh and Larionov, and Irbe, who had suffered an off-ice injury, was released at the end of the season. The team began rebuilding, acquiring forward Owen Nolan from the Colorado Avalanche, as well as several other players. Constantine was fired midway through the season and replaced by interim coach Jim Wiley.

Dean Lombardi era (1996–2003)
During the 1996 off-season, Dean Lombardi was hired as general manager. The next season was no better under Al Sims, with the Sharks again finishing last and winning only 27 games. Their standing would help them draft Patrick Marleau in the 1997 NHL Entry Draft. The Sharks returned to the playoffs in 1997–98 with goaltender Mike Vernon, whom they acquired from the Red Wings, and new head coach Darryl Sutter. For the next two years, the Sharks made the playoffs, yet never advanced past the first round. In 1999, San Jose acquired former Toronto Maple Leafs and Montreal Canadiens star Vincent Damphousse. San Jose's luck changed in the 1999–2000 season, when the Sharks finished with their first-ever winning record. In an upset on par with the one they had pulled on Detroit six years earlier, the Sharks managed to eliminate the St. Louis Blues, who had finished first overall in the league that year, in seven games. However, the Sharks were defeated in the second round of the playoffs by the Dallas Stars. It was their second time losing to Dallas.

In 2000–01, Kazakh goaltender Evgeni Nabokov won the Calder Memorial Trophy as the NHL's best rookie. The team also acquired Finnish star forward Teemu Selanne from the Mighty Ducks of Anaheim. In the 2001 playoffs, the St. Louis Blues eliminated the Sharks in six games in the first round, avenging their 2000 defeat by San Jose. The team's breakout year was 2001–02. Veteran Adam Graves was acquired for Mikael Samuelsson, and the Sharks won their first Pacific Division title. They then defeated the Phoenix Coyotes in the first round of the 2002 playoffs, but fell to the Colorado Avalanche in the second round.

Following the 2001–02 season, the Gunds sold the Sharks to a group of local investors headed by team president Greg Jamison. With starting goaltender Nabokov and defenseman Mike Rathje in contract disputes with general manager Dean Lombardi and the retirement of veteran defenseman Gary Suter, the team got off to a terrible start. Kyle McLaren was acquired in a three-way trade with the Montreal Canadiens and Boston Bruins. Dan McGillis was acquired in exchange for long-time Shark Marcus Ragnarsson, but the team could not turn itself around. Sutter was fired and replaced by Ron Wilson midway through that season.

Near the 2003 NHL trade deadline, captain Owen Nolan was traded to the Toronto Maple Leafs, signaling a new era in Sharks history. In addition, the newly acquired McGillis was traded to Boston, Bryan Marchment went to Colorado, and American Hockey League (AHL) star Shawn Heins and forward Matt Bradley were moved to the Pittsburgh Penguins. The Sharks acquired Alyn McCauley and Wayne Primeau during this season. Reportedly, due to having just acquired the team as well as the team's bad start, the ownership group wanted general manager Dean Lombardi to move high-priced players on the roster. Lombardi failed to do so and consequently lost his job. During that debacle year for San Jose, there were some bright spots. Jim Fahey led all rookie defensemen in the NHL in points, despite playing in only 43 games.

Lombardi's tenure with the team ended with his dismissal on March 18, 2003. Doug Wilson was named to the role on May 13.

Doug Wilson era (2003–2022)

Resurgence
The 2003–04 season, under new general manager Doug Wilson and head coach Ron Wilson saw another turnaround for the team, resulting in the team's best season to that point. An injection of youth, with players like Christian Ehrhoff and out-of-college signing Tom Preissing, and the influx of energy from Alexander Korolyuk jump-started San Jose. Doug Wilson acquired Nils Ekman, and a line of Ekman, McCauley and Korolyuk provided strong play for San Jose, with all three players enjoying career years. Midway through the season, key forward Marco Sturm suffered a broken leg/ankle injury. In response, San Jose acquired Curtis Brown. They posted the third-best record in the NHL with 104 points (31 more than the previous season, and the first time the team had earned 100 points), won the Pacific Division championship and were seeded second in the Western Conference.

In the 2004 playoffs, the Sharks defeated the St. Louis Blues in the Western Conference Quarter-finals and the Colorado Avalanche in the Conference Semi-finals. The San Jose Sharks, for the first time, progressed to the Conference Finals. However, they fell to the Calgary Flames, with ex-coach Daryl Sutter behind the Flames' bench and former Sharks goaltender Miikka Kiprusoff in net. During that season, San Jose, without a captain following Nolan's trade, utilized a rotating captaincy. When the job eventually fell to Patrick Marleau, he kept the captaincy. During the off-season, forward Vincent Damphousse was lost to the Colorado Avalanche (but never played a game for them, as he announced his retirement during the 2004–05 lockout).

Arrival of Joe Thornton
The Sharks started the 2005–06 season slowly, dropping to last place in the Pacific Division. The team lost Alexander Korolyuk. After a ten-game losing streak, the Sharks traded Brad Stuart, Wayne Primeau and Marco Sturm to the Boston Bruins in exchange for star player Joe Thornton. The trade re-energized the team, and with Nabokov sharing starting duties with backup goaltender Vesa Toskala, the Sharks rallied back from their early-season slump to clinch the fifth seed in the Western Conference. In the playoffs, the Sharks defeated the Nashville Predators in the Conference Quarter-finals before falling to the Edmonton Oilers in the Conference Semi-finals. Joe Thornton was awarded the Hart Memorial Trophy as the NHL's Most Valuable Player, as well as the Art Ross Trophy for leading the League in points, with 125. Jonathan Cheechoo was awarded the Maurice "Rocket" Richard Trophy for scoring the most goals during the regular season, with a total of 56.

The Sharks entered the 2006–07 season as the youngest team in average age, as well as the biggest team in average weight, and they raced out to a 20–7–0 start, the best in franchise history. A concern made by fans and members of the media was the lack of a left winger to play on a line with the duo of Thornton and Cheechoo. Wilson seemingly addressed this issue by acquiring 25-year-old 20-goal-scorer Mark Bell from the Chicago Blackhawks. Despite scoring a goal in his first two games with San Jose, Bell was widely considered a flop in San Jose. Off-ice issues, including being cited for drunk driving and an alleged hit-and-run contributed to his on-ice play. By the end of the season, Bell was consistently either a healthy scratch or a fourth-liner.

Two significant trades were made at the trade deadline for defenseman Craig Rivet and winger Bill Guerin. The trades coincided with Nabokov putting together a string of outstanding performances. The Sharks finished the regular season with the best record in franchise history at 51–26–5. In the Conference Quarter-finals, the Sharks defeated the Nashville Predators for the second year in a row. In the Western Conference Semi-finals, the Sharks were defeated for the second time by the Detroit Red Wings.

In advance of the 2007–08 season, the Sharks updated their logos and jerseys to adjust to the new Rbk EDGE jersey.
The Sharks rode on a very hot streak in the month of March. They were aided by the trade-deadline acquisition of Brian Campbell, for whom they gave up Steve Bernier. Going the entire month without a regulation loss, the Sharks captured their third Pacific Division title with a franchise-record 108 points. San Jose started the 2008 playoffs beating the Calgary Flames four games to three in San Jose's first-ever Game 7 on home ice. San Jose eventually lost to the Dallas Stars in the Western Conference Semi-finals. Game 6 required four overtime periods, and was the longest game in the team's history. This was the Sharks' third playoff loss to Dallas.

The Ron Wilson era officially came to an end on May 12 when the Sharks fired him, citing San Jose's disappointing second-round losses in the previous three seasons. Wilson ended his tenure in San Jose with 206 wins, 122 losses, 19 ties, and 48 losses in overtime or in the shootout in 385 regular season games and a 28–24 record in 52 postseason games. He moved on to be hired as head coach of the Toronto Maple Leafs, along with assistant coaches who were also two former Sharks, Tim Hunter and Rob Zettler, to make up the Toronto coaching staff.

Playoff contention, falling short
On June 11, 2008, the San Jose Sharks named former Detroit Red Wings assistant coach Todd McLellan as their new head coach for the 2008–09 season. Todd Richards, Trent Yawney and Jay Woodcroft were named assistant coaches, while Brett Heimlich was named staff assistant. During the off-season, San Jose's major headlines included signing defenseman Rob Blake, acquiring defensemen Dan Boyle and Brad Lukowich, as well as trading defenseman Craig Rivet to the Buffalo Sabres. Midway through the season, San Jose added playoff warrior Claude Lemieux to their roster. Lemieux, 43 years old, was rejoining the NHL after a five-year absence. At the trade deadline, San Jose acquired checking-line winger Travis Moen and the injured defenseman Kent Huskins from the Anaheim Ducks.

The Sharks finished the regular season as presidents' Trophy champions with 53 wins and 117 points, both franchise records. Despite their successful regular season, the Sharks were eliminated by the eighth-seeded Anaheim Ducks in six games in the first round of the playoffs. The team was heavily criticized for once again failing to succeed in the postseason. General manager Doug Wilson promised the team would undergo significant changes in the off-season.

In the 2009 off-season, Wilson held to his word with many major moves. The first was Christian Ehrhoff and Brad Lukowich to the Vancouver Canucks. It was widely believed that San Jose made this trade so it could free up salary cap space to make a second trade: Milan Michalek and Jonathan Cheechoo were sent to the Ottawa Senators in exchange for Dany Heatley and a draft pick. Assistant coach Todd Richards left and was replaced by Matt Shaw. Aside from the trades, several contracts were not renewed, including those of Mike Grier, Marcel Goc, Tomas Plihal and Alexei Semenov.

San Jose also signed forward Scott Nichol and added grit to the team by signing Joe Callahan, Jed Ortmeyer and Manny Malhotra, plus Benn Ferriero. Jeremy Roenick and Claude Lemieux both announced their retirements from the NHL. Another major move by San Jose was stripping Patrick Marleau of the captaincy and assigning it to the newly re-signed Rob Blake. One reason for the move was that Marleau was named captain by Wilson and McLellan wanted to name his own. Dan Boyle and Joe Thornton were named the alternates. On February 7, 2010, San Jose acquired Niclas Wallin from the Carolina Hurricanes. On February 12, 2010, San Jose traded Jody Shelley to the New York Rangers for a draft pick.

The Sharks finished the regular season leading the Western Conference with 113 points and being the second team in the NHL after the Washington Capitals. In the Western Conference Quarter-finals, the Sharks eliminated the Colorado Avalanche. In the Conference Semi-finals, the Sharks defeated the Detroit Red Wings. The eventual Stanley Cup champions, the Chicago Blackhawks, beat the Sharks in the Conference Finals with a four-game sweep.

On June 23, 2010, Wilson announced that they would not offer an unrestricted free agent contract to long-time goaltender Evgeni Nabokov after playing ten seasons with the team. Due to the cap issue, the Sharks had to choose between former captain Patrick Marleau and Nabokov. On July 1, 2010, the Sharks signed goalie Antero Niittymaki from the Tampa Bay Lightning. On September 2, 2010, the Sharks signed former member of the Chicago Blackhawks and Stanley Cup-winning goaltender Antti Niemi to a one-year contract. Niemi was the goaltender who helped the Blackhawks defeat the Sharks in the Western Conference Finals the season before. On March 1, 2011, Niemi signed a four-year contract extension with San Jose worth $15.2 million.

On March 31, 2011, the Sharks clinched their 13th (and seventh consecutive) playoff berth in franchise history with a 6–0 victory over the Dallas Stars. Five days later, they clinched their sixth Pacific Division championship. Entering the 2011 playoffs as the second seed in the Western Conference, the Sharks opened their playoff run with the franchise's first-ever playoff series against division and state rivals, the Los Angeles Kings. After winning Game 1, 3–2 in overtime on a Joe Pavelski goal, the Sharks dropped the second game of the series 4–0, heading to Staples Center with the series tied at one apiece. The Kings took another 4–0 lead in Game 3 but five-second-period goals by the Sharks capped with a Devin Setoguchi overtime winner gave the Sharks a 6–5 victory and tied them for the second-biggest comeback in Stanley Cup playoff history. They would go on to win Game 4, lose Game 5 and finally win the series in its sixth game, with captain Joe Thornton scoring the series winner in the third overtime game of the series.

The Sharks advanced to the Western Conference Semi-finals to face the third-seed Detroit Red Wings, whom they had defeated in five games during the previous postseason's second round. Just like the year prior, the Sharks won the first three games of the series and lost the fourth but instead of replicating the previous year's success in Game 5, the Sharks dropped two more games as the Red Wings became the eighth team in NHL history to force a Game 7 after losing the first three games of a series. However, they would not become the fourth team in history to pull off the comeback as the Sharks prevailed, 3–2, with the game-winning goal scored by former captain Patrick Marleau who had endured media criticism from former teammate and now NBC Sports Network television personality Jeremy Roenick for his lackluster play in Game 5 of the series against the Red Wings. The Sharks advanced to their third Western Conference Finals series, their first playoff meeting with the Vancouver Canucks. San Jose dropped the first two games of the series at Rogers Arena in Vancouver but rebounded with a 4–3 victory thanks to two first-period goals by Marleau in Game 3. However, they lost the fourth game of the series and eventually were eliminated from the playoffs after a Game 5 in Vancouver that featured a game-tying goal by the Canucks' Ryan Kesler with 18.3 seconds remaining in the third period as well as a quirky bounce off a side stanchion that allowed Kevin Bieksa to score the overtime goal that advanced Vancouver to their third Stanley Cup Finals and left the Sharks eliminated in Round 3 for the second consecutive postseason.

The first major move made by San Jose in the 2011 off-season was to trade popular winger (and former first-round pick) Devin Setoguchi, the Sharks' 2010 first-round pick Charlie Coyle and a first-round pick in the 2011 NHL Entry Draft to the Minnesota Wild for All-Star defenseman Brent Burns and a second-round pick in the 2012 Draft. This came after Setoguchi had signed a three-year, $9 million contract extension with the Sharks. The Sharks continued their off-season retool by orchestrating a second transaction with the Wild, shipping Dany Heatley to Minnesota in exchange for Martin Havlat, both to relieve cap space as Heatley was slated to carry a cap hit $2.5 million greater than Havlat's for the duration of their respective contracts and to acquire a player in Havlat with a history of playoff production at the expense of Heatley, whose postseason numbers with the Sharks had been far less than stellar – the forward had managed to score just five goals in 32 playoff games in two years with San Jose.

The Sharks finished the 2011–12 season with a 43–29–10 record, good for 96 points and the seventh seed in the Stanley Cup playoffs. However, after winning Game 1 of their first-round series with the St. Louis Blues in overtime, they lost the final four games of the series, marking the second time they lost in the Quarter-finals under Todd McLellan. Despite the underachievement of the previous year, it was announced that McLellan would remain on the bench for a fifth season.

Prior to the lockout-shortened 2012–13 season, Hockey Hall of Fame player and coach Larry Robinson was added to McLellan's coaching staff to assist with San Jose's penalty-killing unit, which was 29th in the NHL during the previous season. Assistant coach Jim Johnson was also added to bring a defensive style to the play of the Sharks. Brett Heimlich was also promoted to the role of video coordinator to assist the new coaching staff. Along with the two coaches, veteran defenseman Brad Stuart was re-acquired in order to bolster the Sharks' blue line, and on January 12, he played in his first game at HP Pavilion in over seven years. In the first round of the 2013 playoffs, the Sharks swept the Vancouver Canucks, their first series-sweep in franchise history. The Sharks would subsequently fall 4–3 to the defending Stanley Cup champion Los Angeles Kings in the second round of the playoffs.

Prior to the 2013–14 season, the Sharks unveiled new uniforms, which included less orange, along with adding a lace-up collar. In addition to the new uniforms, prior to the start of the season, Brett Heimlich took on the additional role of statistical analyst for the coaching staff. The Sharks started the season 8–0–1, and were the last team in the NHL to stay undefeated in regulation until October 25, when the Sharks lost to the Boston Bruins. In the first round of the 2014 playoffs, the Sharks were matched with rivals and eventual Stanley Cup champion Los Angeles Kings. Although the Sharks took a 3–0 series lead, the Kings came back to tie the series before advancing with a 5–1 win in game seven (only the fourth time in the 97-year history of the NHL where a team lost a best-of-seven series after winning their first three games). After the loss, general manager Doug Wilson described the Sharks' playoff failures "like Charlie Brown trying to kick a football".

On August 20, 2014, head coach Todd McLellan announced the team would go into training camp for the 2014–15 season without a captain, and that all players (including former captains Joe Thornton and Patrick Marleau) would have the opportunity to compete for the captaincy. No captain was named during the season. The Sharks hosted the 2015 NHL Stadium Series against the Kings at Levi's Stadium in February 2015, losing 2–1. Earlier in the season, the Sharks were in playoff contention, but they would ultimately lose games to key Western Conference opponents as the season went on. Despite posting a record of 40–33–9, the Sharks finished fifth in the Pacific Division and missed the playoffs for the first time in ten years. On April 20, 2015, the team announced that they had agreed to "part ways" with McLellan, Johnson and Woodcroft, as well as Video Coordinator Heimlich.

First Stanley Cup Finals

On May 28, 2015, the team named Peter DeBoer as their head coach. During the off-season, the Sharks let John Scott and Scott Hannan leave as free agents. They traded goalie Antti Niemi to the Dallas Stars for a seventh-round draft pick in the 2015 NHL Entry Draft. Then, they acquired forward Joel Ward, goaltender Martin Jones, and defenseman Paul Martin. They also named forward Joe Pavelski the team's captain.

Nearly one year after Peter DeBoer's arrival and a shaky start, the Sharks surged in the second half of the season to return to the playoffs, finishing with 98 points and third in the Pacific Division. They defeated the Los Angeles Kings in five games, the Nashville Predators in seven games, and the St. Louis Blues in six games to win the Western Conference championship. This marked the first time in franchise history that the Sharks advanced to play in the Stanley Cup Final. The Sharks ultimately lost the Stanley Cup Finals in the best-of-seven series against the Pittsburgh Penguins in six games.

Continuing contention
In the following season, the Sharks finished in third place in the Pacific Division, but were defeated by the Edmonton Oilers in six games in the first round of the 2017 playoffs. Following the season, long-time stalwart Patrick Marleau left the team to sign with the Toronto Maple Leafs, ending his 20-year tenure with the team. He left holding almost every offensive record in team history, such as power-play goals, goals, short-handed goals and games played.

In the 2017–18 season, the Sharks once again finished in third place in the Pacific Division. They swept the Anaheim Ducks in the first round of the 2018 playoffs, but lost to the expansion Vegas Golden Knights in six games in the second round.

The 2018–19 season saw another playoff berth for the Sharks, overcoming a three games to one lead, once again by the Vegas Golden Knights, and in a dramatic comeback in the third period of game 7, and the team would make it into the Western Conference Finals, falling to the eventual Stanley Cup champion St. Louis Blues in six games. On October 8, 2019, after two seasons in Toronto, Patrick Marleau was re-acquired by the Sharks.

Missing the playoffs
On December 11, 2019, with the Sharks at 15–16–2 and failing to win a game during their five-game away game stretch, DeBoer and his staff were fired. After DeBoer's firing, assistant coach Bob Boughner was named interim head coach. In March 2020, four months after Boughner became interim coach, the league was forced to suspend operations as a result of the COVID-19 pandemic. When the 2019–20 season resumed in June with the playoffs, the Sharks were not included. Boughner's interim label was removed on September 22, 2020.

Due to the COVID-19 pandemic, the divisions for the 2020–21 season were realigned. The Sharks played in the West Division. The Sharks missed the playoffs for the second year in a row.

General manager Doug Wilson took medical leave beginning November 26, 2021, and resigned while away from the team on April 7, 2022. Assistant general manager Joe Will was elevated to interim general manager while the team sought a permanent candidate for the role.

The team missed the playoffs for the third straight season, and head coach Bob Boughner and other members of the coaching staff were relieved of duties in the summer in advance of the Sharks naming a new general manager.

Mike Grier era (2022–present)
On July 5, the Sharks hired former player Mike Grier to serve as their new general manager, becoming the first black general manager in NHL history and fifth general manager in franchise history. Grier, who played in 221 games with the Sharks from 2006 to 2009 and was a member of the Sharks 2008-09 Presidents Trophy-winning team, immediately began reshaping the team.

On July 13, 2022, the Sharks traded longtime defenseman Brent Burns to the Carolina Hurricanes and signed forwards Oskar Lindblom, Nico Sturm, and defenseman Matt Benning. On July 26, Grier named former Rangers coach David Quinn as the team's new head coach before later hiring Scott Gordon and Ryan Warsofsky as assistants.

Team information

Logo and jerseys

The Sharks' iconic logo of a shark chomping on a hockey stick has been in use since their inaugural 1991–92 season, with slight modifications prior to the 2007–08 season. The triangle on the logo references the Bay Area's Red Triangle near the Pacific Ocean. The Sharks also use various partial and alternate logos based on the primary logo.

The original Sharks' road jerseys were teal with white, gray and black striping and featured white block lettering with black trim. Home uniforms were white with teal, gray and black striping and featured teal block lettering with black trim. Both jerseys included the team's "fin" logo on either shoulder and were used until the 1997–98 season.

The Sharks introduced their future road (later home) jersey as an alternate during the 1997–98 season, featuring a darker teal base, wide gray sleeve and shoulder striping and modernized lettering. A white home (later road) counterpart was introduced the following season and featured teal and gray shoulder and sleeve stripes. In the 2001–02 season, the Sharks began wearing a black third jersey, featuring the return of the "fin" logo and minimalist teal and white sleeve stripes.

Upon switching to the Reebok Edge template in 2007, the Sharks introduced new home and away jerseys. The teal home jersey featured a black shoulder yoke while the white road jersey used a teal shoulder yoke. Both jerseys replaced gray with orange trim on the stripes and lettering, featured the "jumping shark" logo on the shoulders, and added numbers on the right chest.

Before the 2008–09 season, the Sharks introduced a new black alternate jersey, minus the contrasting shoulder yoke, tail stripes and orange trim. It also featured the "jumping shark" logo in front and the "SJ" alternate logo on the shoulders. The jersey served as the basis of their new set introduced before the 2013–14 season, which eliminated the shoulder yoke and tail stripes, added neckline laces and eliminated the orange accents. The front numbers were replaced with the Sharks' 25th-anniversary logo prior to the 2015–16 season.

Following the switch to Adidas' AdiZero template in 2017, the Sharks kept much of their basic look save for the replacement of the "jumping shark" logo in favor of the "screaming shark" logo (home jersey) and "SJ" logo (road jersey) on the shoulder. The slogan "This Is Sharks Territory" was added inside the neckline. The black alternates were retired prior to the season, but in 2018, a new black jersey was introduced. Known as the "Stealth" jersey, it featured a slightly different rendition of the primary Sharks logo, an updated version of the original "fin" logo on the shoulders and stylized circuit board sleeve striping. The "Stealth" uniforms were not used in the 2020–21 season as the Sharks opted to wear their "Reverse Retro" and "Heritage" alternate uniforms in the shortened season (see descriptions below).

The Sharks participated in the 2015 NHL Stadium Series by wearing a tricolor jersey of teal, white and black accented by the primary Sharks logo in front and a new "Northern California" alternate logo on the shoulders. The back of the jersey remained teal and featured larger lettering.

During the 2015–16 season, as part of their 25th anniversary, the Sharks wore a slightly modified version of their original teal jerseys for a few home games. These uniforms were brought back in 2021 for the Sharks' 30th anniversary, albeit modified to the AdiZero cut.

The Sharks wore "Reverse Retro" alternate uniforms for the 2020–21 season. The design used was similar to the teal uniforms they wore from 1997 to 2007, but with a gray base and black stripes.

The Sharks released new uniforms in 2022, featuring elements inspired from the team's original 1991–1998 uniform set. In addition, the Sharks changed its pants, gloves and home helmet to teal. The Sharks also unveiled a second "Reverse Retro" uniform based on the last uniforms worn by their Bay Area predecessors, the California Golden Seals. The design replaced the "Seals" wordmark with "Sharks" in teal and gold trim.

Broadcasters

Television
Randy Hahn: play-by-play
Bret Hedican: color commentator
Drew Remenda: color commentator/studio analyst
Brodie Brazil: studio host
Curtis Brown: studio analyst

Radio
Dan Rusanowsky: play-by-play
Scott Hannan: color commentator for select games
Drew Remenda: color commentator 
Bret Hedican: color commentator

One of the first group of broadcasters for the Sharks was Joe Starkey, who did play-by-play alongside Pete Stemkowski (both 1991–92) and 1992–93) and Brian Hayward (1991–92 when sidelined with injuries) on color commentary. CSN Bay Area (now NBC Sports Bay Area) was the television home of San Jose Sharks until the end of the 2008–09 NHL season, when their games moved to Comcast SportsNet California (now NBC Sports California). Over-the-air telecasts aired on KGO 7 from 1991–1994 and on KICU 36 from 1995–1999. Other television color commentators include Chris Collins (1996–97), Steve Konroyd (1997–2000), Drew Remenda (2000–06; 2007–14), Marty McSorley (2006–07), Jamie Baker (2014–20), and Kendall Coyne Schofield (2019–20).

Traditions

The Sharks' best-known tradition is their pre-game entrance scene. At the beginning of each Sharks home game, the lights go down and a 17-foot open shark mouth is lowered from the rafters. As the mouth is lowered the eyes flash red and fog pours out. Then, a live view of the locker room tunnel with Sharks players is shown on the scoreboard and the goalie leads the team out of the locker room, through the mouth, and onto the ice. The Sharks currently use "Seek & Destroy" by Metallica as their entrance song. Previous entrance songs include Metallica's version of "Breadfan" and "Get Ready for This" by 2 Unlimited. The latter song has been used as the team's goal song since 2016.

Any time the Sharks go on the power play, the Jaws theme song is played while the fans do "The Chomp", extending their arms in front and moving them up and down to form a chomping jaw.

Since 2015, the fan-driven Supporters Club, Teal City Crew, has sit atop sections 217–218, organizing marches to the arena, charity drives, and creating tifo related to the games being played, most notably the "retirement" banner for NHL veteran, Mike Hoffman, for his temporary trade to the Sharks, before being later traded that same day to the Florida Panthers.

Rivalries
The Sharks have historically had rivalries with the two other California National Hockey League teams, the Anaheim Ducks and the Los Angeles Kings. They also share a developing rivalry with the Vegas Golden Knights.

Season-by-season record
This is a partial list of the last five seasons completed by the Sharks. For the full season-by-season history, see List of San Jose Sharks seasons

Note: GP = Games played, W = Wins, L = Losses, T = Ties, OTL = Overtime Losses, Pts = Points, GF = Goals for, GA = Goals against

Players

Current roster

Hall of Famers
The San Jose Sharks hold an affiliation with a number of inductees to the Hockey Hall of Fame. Six inductees from the players category of the Hall of Fame are affiliated with the Sharks.

Retired numbers

The team is unable to issue No. 99 to its players due to NHL retiring the number league-wide in honor of Wayne Gretzky at the 2000 NHL All-Star Game.

Team captains
Doug Wilson, 1991–1993
Bob Errey, 1993–1995
Jeff Odgers, 1995–1996
Todd Gill, 1996–1998
Owen Nolan, 1998–2003
Rotating for first half of 2003–04 season
Mike Ricci (first 10 games)
Vincent Damphousse (next 20 games)
Alyn McCauley (next 10 games)
Patrick Marleau, 2004–2009
Rob Blake, 2009–2010
Joe Thornton, 2010–2014
Joe Pavelski, 2015–2019
Logan Couture, 2019–present

Franchise regular season scoring leaders

These are the top-ten-point-scorers in franchise regular season history. Figures are updated after each completed NHL regular season.

  – current Sharks player
Note: Pos = Position; GP = Games Played; G = Goals; A = Assists; Pts = Points; P/G = Points per game

Franchise playoff scoring leaders

These are the top-ten playoff point-scorers in franchise playoff history. Figures are updated after each completed NHL season.

NHL awards and trophies

Clarence S. Campbell Bowl
2015–16

Presidents' Trophy
2008–09

Art Ross Trophy
Joe Thornton*: 2005–06

Bill Masterton Memorial Trophy
Tony Granato: 1996–97

Calder Memorial Trophy
Evgeni Nabokov: 2000–01

Hart Memorial Trophy
Joe Thornton*: 2005–06

James Norris Memorial Trophy
Brent Burns: 2016–17
Maurice "Rocket" Richard Trophy
Jonathan Cheechoo: 2005–06

NHL Foundation Player Award
Brent Burns: 2014–15

All-Star Game head coach
Todd McLellan: 2009, 2012

See also
1991 NHL Dispersal and Expansion Drafts
List of San Jose Sharks draft picks
Strikeforce, a mixed martial arts promotion with ties to the franchise

References

External links

"San Jose strengthens ties to China Sharks" nhl.com, August 20, 2008
"New-look Anyang Halla adds western flavor" nhl.com, July 31, 2008
"Former NHLers find hockey adventure in Japan" nhl.com, March 26, 2008

 
National Hockey League teams
1991 establishments in California
Ice hockey clubs established in 1991
Ice hockey teams in California
Pacific Division (NHL)
Sports teams in San Jose, California
National Hockey League in the San Francisco Bay Area